Chula may refer to:

Thailand 
 Chulalongkorn (Rama V, 1853–1910), Siamese King
 Chula Chakrabongse (1908–1963), Siamese Prince
 Chulalongkorn University, Bangkok, Thailand
 Maha Chulalongkorn ("Great Chulalongkorn"), Chulalongkorn University anthem composed by King Bhumibol Adulyadej
 Chularatchamontri, Thai Shaykh al-Islām

Places 
 Chula, Missouri
 Chula, Georgia
 Chula, Virginia
 Chula, Somalia
Chula Vista, California

Characters 
 Chula the Tarantula, a character from the TV series Fievel's American Tails, originally introduced in the film An American Tail: Fievel Goes West
 Chula, a species in the Doctor Who universe
 Chula, a martial arts student in the Bond film, The Man with the Golden Gun

Others uses 
 Chula (Star Trek), a dice-based Wadi game in the Star Trek universe
 , a typical dessert of region of Galicia, in Spain
 Chula (music), a Portuguese and Afro-Brazilian style of music and dance (see also Chula at Portuguese Wikipedia)
 Chula series, paintings about the working-class women of Madrid by Filipino painter and hero Juan Luna

See also
 Chula Vista